Dushmani is a 1995 Indian Urdu-language romantic action film directed by Bunty Soorma. It stars Sunny Deol, Jackie Shroff, Manisha Koirala, Deepti Naval, Anupam Kher in pivotal roles. The rights of this film are now owned by Shah Rukh Khan's Red Chillies Entertainment. Acclaimed director Shekhar Kapur directed major portions of the film.

Plot
Bitter enmity has always existed between the Singh and the Oberoi families. With each and every generation swearing to extract vengeance. This generation consists of Suraj Singh (Sunny Deol) and his elder brother, Jai (Jackie Shroff). While Jai leads the life of a gangster, Suraj is not inclined to violence at all. He meets with a young woman named Sapna (Manisha Koirala), and both fall in love with each other. When he takes Sapna to be introduced to Jai and the rest of his family, he is forbidden from marrying Sapna, as she is the sister of Oberoi (Anupam Kher). Suraj and Sapna are able to convince Jai and the rest of the Singh family to give up this enmity, and let them marry. One day, Oberoi's men attack Suraj's friend Raghu and injure him. Suraj goes tho Oberoi's garage and kills all of his goons. However, Raghu dies from his injuries. Enraged, Suraj chases down one of the goons and kills him. Jai goes to meet Oberoi, and proposes marriage, and to his joy, Oberoi agrees, and both families start preparations for the marriage. Jai starts to relax and thinks about giving up his gangster-like life. It is then a group of men target him with automatic weapons, leaving him mortally wounded and hospitalized. When Suraj finds out, he is enraged, and decides to avenge his brother's injuries. He finds out that the assailants are none other than Oberoi's men, and he swears to bring an end to Oberoi and his criminal empire. Suraj fights Oberoi's men along with Jai and he wounds Oberoi. Before dying, Oberoi tells Jai that he was wrong about love and that he wants to seek forgiveness. However, he had tricked him and stabs Jai with a knife. Suraj then kills Oberoi. Jai tells Suraj that Oberoi had never changed at all before dying. The film ends with Suraj and Sapna united, and Suraj scattering Jai's ashes in the lake.

Cast
 Sunny Deol as Suraj Singh
 Jackie Shroff as Jai Singh
 Manisha Koirala as Sapna Oberoi
 Deepti Naval as Rama Oberoi
 Anupam Kher as Oberoi
 Pradeep Rawat 
 Raghuveer Yadav as Raghu
 Manohar Singh as Sardar Sahib
 Dina Pathak as Buaji
Varsha Usgaonkar as dancer for the song, 'Mera Salaam Le'

Soundtrack
The music was composed by Anand Shrivastav and Milind Shrivastav (known together as Anand–Milind) and lyrics were provided by Sameer.

References

External links

1990s Hindi-language films
1995 films
Films scored by Anand–Milind